Wem Rural is a civil parish in Shropshire, England.  It contains 59 listed buildings that are recorded in the National Heritage List for England.  Of these, one is listed at Grade I, the highest of the three grades, three are at Grade II*, the middle grade, and the others are at Grade II, the lowest grade.  The parish consists of an area around the town of Wem, but not the town itself.  It contains the villages of Aston, Coton, Quina Brook, and Tilley and smaller settlements, and is otherwise rural.  Most of the listed buildings are houses and associated structures, cottages, farmhouses and farm buildings, a high proportion of which are timber framed or have a timber framed core.  The other listed  buildings include churches, items in a churchyard, a former manor house, a public house, four bridges, two lime kilns, and six mileposts.  For the listed buildings within the town of Wem, see Listed buildings in Wem Urban.


Key

Buildings

References

Citations

Sources

Lists of buildings and structures in Shropshire